Kishan is a surname. Notable people with the surname include:

Gouri G. Kishan (1999), actress from Kerala
Ishan Kishan (1998), Indian international cricketer
Ravi Kishan (1969), Indian actor, politician, film producer and television personality
Sanjoy Kishan (born 1970), Bharatiya Janata Party politician
Sundeep Kishan (born 1987), Indian actor and producer 
Vinoth Kishan (born 1989), Indian actor

Hindustani-language surnames
Surnames of Hindustani origin